Di royte fon ('The Red Flag') was a Yiddish-language publication in Congress Poland, issued by the Social Democracy of the Kingdom of Poland and Lithuania (SDKPiL) between June and September 1906. The publication was part of a short-lived effort (1905-1906) of the SDKPiL to organize Jewish workers in the Pale of Settlement.

References

See also 
 Di royte fon (1920)

Yiddish periodicals
Publications established in 1906
Socialist newspapers
Defunct newspapers published in Poland
Publications disestablished in 1906
Congress Poland
Yiddish-language mass media in Poland
1906 establishments in the Russian Empire